In organic chemistry, a methylene bridge, methylene spacer, or methanediyl group is any part of a molecule with formula ; namely, a carbon atom bound to two hydrogen atoms and connected by single bonds to two other distinct atoms in the rest of the molecule.  It is the repeating unit in the skeleton of the unbranched alkanes.

A methylene bridge can also act as a bidentate ligand joining two metals in a coordination compound, such as titanium and aluminum in Tebbe's reagent.

A methylene bridge is often called a methylene group or simply methylene, as in "methylene chloride" (dichloromethane ). As a bridge in other compounds, for example in cyclic compounds, it is given the name methano. However, the term methylene group (or "methylidene") properly applies to the  group when it is connected to the rest of the molecule by a double bond, giving it chemical properties very distinct from those of a bridging  group.

Reactions
Compounds possessing a methylene bridge located between two strong electron withdrawing groups (such as nitro, carbonyl or nitrile groups) are sometimes called active methylene compounds. Treatment of these with strong bases can form enolates or carbanions, which are often used in organic synthesis. Examples include the Knoevenagel condensation and the malonic ester synthesis.

Examples 
Examples of compounds which contain methylene bridges include:

See also
 Methyl group
 Methylene group
 Methyne

References

Functional groups